Kole is a territory in Sankuru province of the Democratic Republic of the Congo.

Democratic Republic of Congo geography articles needing translation from French Wikipedia
Territories of Sankuru Province